Euphorbia punicea is a species of euphorb commonly known as Jamaican poinsettia. It was first described by Olof Peter Swartz in his Nova genera et species plantarum seu prodromus. It grows as a bush or tree three to five meters (10–16 ft) tall, and sometimes much taller. The false flower is in fact a cyathium surrounded by large, colorful bracts.

References

External links

punicea
Flora of the Caribbean
Taxa named by Olof Swartz
Flora without expected TNC conservation status